Lisa Stolzenberg is an American criminologist. She is a professor in, and chair of, the Department of Criminal Justice at Florida International University (FIU).

Education and career
Stolzenberg attended the University of Florida, where she received her B.S. in criminal justice in 1985. She went on to receive her M.S. and Ph.D. in criminology from Florida State University in 1986 and 1993, respectively. Before joining FIU, she held multiple other positions, including professor of public policy at Indiana University – Purdue University Fort Wayne.

References

External links

American criminologists
Florida International University faculty
Living people
University of Florida alumni
Florida State University alumni
Indiana University – Purdue University Fort Wayne faculty
American women social scientists
American women criminologists
Year of birth missing (living people)
American women academics
21st-century American women